Ibrahim Mahgoub (born 1921) was a Lebanese wrestler. He competed in the men's Greco-Roman light heavyweight at the 1948 Summer Olympics.

References

External links
 

1921 births
Possibly living people
Lebanese male sport wrestlers
Olympic wrestlers of Lebanon
Wrestlers at the 1948 Summer Olympics
Place of birth missing